Niall Cousens (born 25 February 1991 in Canada) is a Canadian retired soccer player.

Career

In 2009, Cousens signed for SK Slavia Prague, one of the most successful teams in the Czech Republic, after scoring two goals in a friendly while on trial.

For 2010-11, he was loaned to Hlučín in the Czech second division.

After an invitation to play in Germany never happened, Cousens joined Vancouver Whitecaps before enrolling in the University of British Columbia in 2013, where he played for their soccer team.

References

External links
 Niall Cousens at Soccerway

Canadian soccer players
Living people
Association football forwards
1991 births
FC Hlučín players